Eucoenogenes atripalpa is a moth of the family Tortricidae that is endemic to Vietnam.

The ground colour of the forewings is white. The markings are black (although they are mixed with brownish in the tornal area). The hindwings are brownish.

References

Moths described in 2009
Endemic fauna of Vietnam
Moths of Asia
atripalpa
Taxa named by Józef Razowski